Chris Bigler (born February 11, 1949 in Zurich) is a Swiss retired businessman and poker player.

Bigler began playing poker in 1997 on a trip to Las Vegas and studied the game. He made the final table of the 1999 World Series of Poker (WSOP) $10,000 no limit hold'em main event, earning $212,420 for his 5th-place finish. He is the only Swiss player to have made the final table of the WSOP main event.

Bigler also made two final tables during the first season of the World Poker Tour (WPT), finishing 5th during the inaugural WPT event, and runner-up to Paul Darden in the Gold Rush event.

In addition, he has finished 2nd in two events of the Professional Poker Tour (PPT) and was a quarter-finalist in the 2002 World Heads-Up Poker Championship.

As of 2015, his total live tournament winnings exceed $1,425,000.

Chris Bigler has also worked as a senior poker consultant for several major online poker sites.

Trivia
 Bigler is an avid skier.
 Bigler's favorite movie is High Noon.

References

External links

 WPT profile

Swiss poker players
1949 births
Living people